Meenangadi is an old town situated on the highway NH 766 between Kalpetta and Sulthan Bathery in Wayanad District, in Kerala, India. This place is one among the Provinces where the existence of Dolmens provide an historical evidence of earlier civilisation. Coffee bean, Black pepper, Ginger, Rice and Areca are the major crops cultivated in this area. Meenangadi is famous for its Fish Market and Cattle Market. The nearest railway station is at Kozhikode at 87 km and airport is Kannur International Airport with 94 km from Meenangadi. Meenangadi is surrounded by, Ambalavayal Panchayat, Kalpetta Taluk towards west, Gudalur Taluk towards East, Mananthavady Taluk towards west. Kalpetta, Sultan Bathery, Kozhikode are the nearby Cities and towns to Meenangadi.
Kerala's first carbon neutrality project launched in Meenangadi in June 2016. Upon achieving the goals of the project, Meenangadi will be the first village in India to go completely carbon neutral.
Meenangadi has a population of 33450 According to 2011 Census with two Villages Purakkadi and (Part)Krishnagiri.

Educational institutions 
 Government Polytechnic, Mananthavady Road
 Government Higher Secondary School Meenangadi
 Government Commercial Institute, Meenangadi
 St. Gregorios Teachers' Training College, JECS Campus, Christ Nagar (offering B.Ed., M.Ed. & PhD)
 St. Mary's College, JECS Campus, Christ Nagar (offering BA, B.Com. & BBA courses of Calicut University)
 St. Baselios Arts & Science College, JECS Campus, Christ Nagar
 IHRD Model College of Applied Sciences, Meenangadi
 St. Peter's & St. Paul's English Higher Secondary School
 Sree Vivekananda Vidya Mandir
 Anns English Medium School

Climate

References

Villages in Wayanad district
Cities and towns in Wayanad district